

Former hospitals

References

 Top American Hospitals

Michigan
 
Hospitals